¡Leche Con Carne! the third studio album by punk rock band No Use for a Name, released in 1995. The album title is Spanish for "milk with meat".

Background
The band gained critical recognition for this album and supported the Offspring on the Smash tour. After this tour, guitarist Ed Gregor and bassist Steve Papoutsis left No Use for a Name and would be replaced by Chris Shiflett and Matt Riddle on guitar and bass respectively.

The final track, after three minutes of silence, features a covers medley of the Cars' "Just What I Needed", Green Day's "Basket Case", Missing Persons' "Words", Berlin's "The Metro", David Bowie's "Space Oddity", Toni Basil's "Mickey", the Knack's "My Sharona", Twisted Sister's "We're Not Gonna Take It", Pat Benatar's "Hit Me with Your Best Shot", Yes's "Owner of a Lonely Heart" and Aerosmith's "Walk This Way".

Track listing

Personnel
Tony Sly - Vocals and Guitar
 Ed Gregor – guitar
 Steve Papoutsis – bass
 Rory Koff – drums

References

No Use for a Name albums
1995 albums
Fat Wreck Chords albums
Albums produced by Ryan Greene